At least two ships of the Argentine Navy have been named Murature:

 , a minesweeper previously the German M-74 and renamed on transfer in 1922. She was decommissioned in 1938.
 , a  launched in 1944 and decommissioned in 2014.

Argentine Navy ship names